This is a list of Croatian television related events from 2004.

Events
24 April - The Croatian version of Pop Idol debuts on Nova TV.
5 June - Žanamari Lalić wins the first season of Hrvatski Idol.
18 September - The Croatian version of Big Brother debuts on RTL.
26 September - The first season of Big Brother is won by Saša Tkalčević.

Debuts
24 April - Hrvatski Idol (2004-2005)
18 September - Big Brother (2004-2008, 2016–present)
25 October - Zabranjena ljubav (2004-2008)

Television shows

Ending this year

Births

Deaths